The Byeongsan Seowon is a seowon located in Byeongsa-ri village of the Pungcheon-myeon township in the city of Andong, North Gyeongsang Province, South Korea. Seowon is a type of local academy during the Joseon Dynasty (1392–1897). It was first established as Jondeoksa (尊德祠) by local Confucian scholars especially Jeong Gyeong-se (鄭經世) in 1613, the fifth year of King Gwanghaegung's reign, to commemorate the scholarly achievement and virtue of the notable Confucian scholar and politician Ryu Seong-ryong. The predecessor of the seowon was Pungak Seodang (豊岳書堂) which was a school located in Pungsan to teach the Pungsan Ryu clan during the Goryeo period. Ryu Seong-ryong moved the seodang to the current place in 1572.

History
The history of Byeongsan Seowon began when Ryu Seong-ryong moved to Andong in 1572 from Pungak Seodang, a Confucian school established during the Goryeo period.
After Ryu Seong-ryong died in 1607, local Confucianists such as Jeong Gyeong-se founded Jondeok Temple in 1613 and enshrined an ancestral tablet to commemorate his academic work and virtues.
The temple was renamed Byeongsan Seowon in 1614. 

In 1620, following a public discussion among Confucianists, the ancestral tablet was moved to Yeogang Seowon, a memorial Seowon for Toegye. In 1629 new ancestral tablets to worship Ryu Seong-ryong and his third son Ryu were made. 

Byeongsan Seowon served as a branch of local education to produce many scholars. In 1868, Heungseon Daewongun ordered to remove it, but it was not damaged. The auditorium was rebuilt in 1921 under Japanese rule. Hyangsarye, a memorial ceremony for Ryu Seong-ryong and Ryu Jin, is held here every March and September.

It is designated as Historic Site No. 260 and contains about 3,000 books of about 1,000 different types, including a collection of books by Ryu Seong-ryong.

See also
Dosan Seowon
Korean Confucianism

References

External links

 병산서원(屛山書院) at Yesullo

Seowon
Andong
1572 establishments in Asia
Buildings and structures in North Gyeongsang Province